Trichilia catigua is a flowering plant species in the genus Trichilia.

The species is used in folk medicine and shamanism in the aphrodisiac and stimulant catuaba. Cinchonain-Ib is a flavonolignan found in the bark of T. catigua.

References

External links

catigua